Sperafico is the surname of a family of Brazilian racing drivers.  Ten members of the family have competed in racing series both worldwide and in Brazil.

The four most notable members of the family are listed below.  Two are brothers and the other two are their cousins.

The members are two brothers:
 Ricardo Sperafico (born July 23, 1979 in Toledo, Paraná) — at least one season in the Champ Car World Series.  Also raced in Formula 3000, finishing as series runner-up in 2003.
 Rodrigo Sperafico (born July 23, 1979 in Toledo, Paraná) — raced in F3000 and F3 series. Also raced in the Brazilian stock car series, although not in the same category as cousin Rafael.

and two cousins:
 Alexandre Sperafico (born January 21, 1974) from Toledo, Paraná — currently competing in the Champ Car Atlantic Championship. He is the oldest of the four racing Speraficos.
 Rafael Sperafico (April 22, 1981 in Toledo, Paraná – December 9, 2007 in São Paulo) — killed while racing at Interlagos in a junior league race to the Stock Car Brasil series (Stock Car Light) when his car was t-boned by another driver.

The four family members often competed against each other in Brazilian F3 racing during the late 1990s among other series. Rodrigo and Ricardo also competed against each other for competing teams during the 2000 Italian Formula 3000 season. The two were joined by Alexandre in the 2002 International Formula 3000 season.

References

 
Surnames
Brazilian families